Gustaaf De Smet (15 May 1935 – 28 May 2020) was a Belgian cyclist. He competed in three events at the 1956 Summer Olympics. He became East-Flemish champion in 1964.

De Smet died on 28 May 2020, aged 85.

Major results
Source:

1956
 1st Ronde van Vlaanderen Beloften
1957
 2nd Schaal Sels
1960
 1st Schaal Sels
1961
 3rd Omloop van Limburg
 3rd Kampioenschap van Vlaanderen
 8th Scheldeprijs
 8th Paris–Tours
1962
 1st GP Victor Standaert
 2nd Nationale Sluitingprijs
 5th Overall Tour du Nord
 6th Kampioenschap van Vlaanderen
 7th Scheldeprijs
1963
 1st GP de Denain
 2nd Nationale Sluitingprijs
 3rd Brabantse Pijl
 4th Kampioenschap van Vlaanderen
1964
 1st Kampioenschap van Vlaanderen
 1st Nationale Sluitingprijs
 1st Omloop der Vlaamse Gewesten
 2nd De Kustpijl
 3rd Paris–Tours
 4th Dwars door België
 6th Kuurne–Brussels–Kuurne
 8th Tour of Flanders
1965
 1st  Overall Four Days of Dunkirk
1st Stages 1, 2 & 5
 2nd Paris–Tours
 2nd Schaal Sels
 2nd Circuit des Onze Villes
 3rd Gent–Wevelgem
 3rd Kampioenschap van Vlaanderen
 3rd Nokere Koerse
 5th Paris–Brussels
 8th Tour of Flanders
 9th Kuurne–Brussels–Kuurne
1966
 1st Kuurne–Brussels–Kuurne
 2nd Nationale Sluitingprijs
 3rd Kampioenschap van Vlaanderen
 3rd Paris–Roubaix
 5th Paris–Brussels
 5th Paris–Tours
1967
 1st GP Flandria
 3rd Kampioenschap van Vlaanderen
 3rd GP Stad Zottegem
 5th Dwars door België
 8th Kuurne–Brussels–Kuurne
1968
 1st Circuit du Houtland-Torhout
 6th Circuit des Onze Villes
 7th Dwars door België

References

External links
 

1935 births
2020 deaths
Belgian male cyclists
Olympic cyclists of Belgium
Cyclists at the 1956 Summer Olympics
Sportspeople from Ghent
Cyclists from East Flanders